The 1980 Badminton World Cup was the second edition of an international tournament Badminton World Cup. The event was held in Kyoto, Japan in the month of January. Competitions for mixed doubles were not conducted. Indonesia won men's singles and men's doubles events while Japan won women's doubles and Denmark won women's singles event.

Medalists

Final results

References 
 
 
Badminton World Cup
1980 in badminton
1980 in Japanese sport
Sports competitions in Kyoto
International sports competitions hosted by Japan